General Capper may refer to:

John Capper (1861–1955), British Army major general
Thompson Capper (1863–1915), British Army major general